Boogeyman 2 is a 2007 American horror film edited and directed by Jeff Betancourt and the sequel to the 2005 film Boogeyman. The film was written by Brian Sieve and stars Danielle Savre, Matt Cohen, David Gallagher, Mae Whitman, Renee O'Connor and Tobin Bell. Savre portrays Laura Porter, a woman who witnessed her parents' murder alongside her brother as a child. She believes the killer to be the Boogeyman, and now as an adult seeks group therapy to overcome her phobia of the creature. However, her fears become reality as her fellow patients are murdered one by one.

Due to the previous film's financial success, Boogeyman 2 was announced in October 2006. Production of the film began in the same month with the hiring of Betancourt as director and Sieve attached as writer. Casting began in December of the same year with the hiring of O'Connor; Savre got the lead role in January 2007. Filming took place in Los Angeles at the former hospital, Linda Vista Community Hospital, over a four-month period, beginning in January 2007 and concluding in April. Unlike the original film, which featured the Boogeyman as a supernatural being, Betancourt strove to present a more grounded and realistic version of the mythical creature. Additionally, emphasis was placed on the writing and atmosphere to compensate for the film's small $4.5 million budget.

After screening at the Screamfest Horror Film Festival on October 20, 2007, Boogeyman 2 was released direct-to-video in the United States on January 8, 2008; it was later released theatrically in Russia and Italy. It received largely negative reviews from critics, although it was deemed to be a general improvement over its predecessor. Attention was especially given to the human-like nature of the Boogeyman in the film, which reviewers felt was preferable to monsters in other contemporary creature features, including the previous film. Despite a mediocre commercial performance, recouping slightly less than its budget, the film received a sequel, Boogeyman 3, the following year.

Plot
As young children Laura Porter and her brother Henry witness their parents' brutal murder by a hooded man, whom they believe to be the Boogeyman. As an adult, Henry has attended group therapy, improving such that he is instead currently looking for work. Laura joins this group as he leaves, meeting the other members: nyctophobic Mark, germaphobic Paul, masochistic Alison, agoraphobic and commitment-averse Darren, and Nicky, a bulimic girl who fears extreme weight gain.

Upon her joining, however, the members of the group are targeted and murdered one by one. All of their deaths relate to their fears: Mark falls down an elevator shaft, trying to escape from the darkness when the lights go out, and is torn in half. Paul accidentally consumes a cockroach while eating a bag of chips; he is given cleaning solution by a masked figure, and upon drinking it, burns a hole in his throat. Laura begins to suspect these deaths are not accidental. The hospital loses power, leaving Laura, Alison, Darren, Nicky, Dr. Jessica Ryan, and the receptionist Gloria in the dark. Gloria goes to the basement to turn the lights back on, but once the patients return to their rooms, Alison is tied to her bed by the figure who places maggots on her arms, which burrow into her self-inflicted incisions in her skin, and she kills herself attempting to cut them out.

Dr. Ryan goes to the basement to check on Gloria, but is electrocuted by the killer while standing in a puddle of water. Laura finds a file on her brother and those of other patients with bogyphobia—phobia of the Boogeyman. She learns that all bogyphobia patients - including Tim Jensen - have committed suicide after being treated by Dr. Mitchell Allen. Laura learns from Darren that Dr. Allen went to sadistic measure to cure her brother by locking him in a closet which Laura fears might have sent Henry over the edge. Laura finds Alison's corpse, but the remains in the bedroom have been cleaned up after alerting the others before they could notice. Darren and Nicky go to his room, where they argue about the viability of their relationship. After Nicky left the room, the Boogeyman disembowels Darren and remove his heart before capturing Nicky who was found by Laura on a basement table with hoses attached to her, pumping bile into her body until she explodes.

The Boogeyman chases Laura through the hospital; along the way she finds Gloria's body and Dr. Ryan, barely alive and mumbling in a trance-like state. She also runs into Dr. Allen, who believes Laura committed the killings. He tries to sedate her, but is stopped by the Boogeyman who stabs him and shoves two needles into his eyes. The Boogeyman is revealed to be Henry; Dr. Allen did locked him in a closet in an attempt to treat him of his bogyphobia, and the Boogeyman possessed Henry at that time. The chase ends when Laura decapitates the Boogeyman with gardening shears. The police arrive and discover that under the Boogeyman mask was Dr. Ryan; after killing Dr. Allen but prior to chasing Laura, Henry put the mask on the doctor and escaped. Laura realizes that Henry is running free and is framed for the murders and arrested.

In a post-credits scene, the Boogeyman looks at a picture of Laura and Henry as adults before disappearing.

Cast

 Danielle Savre as Laura Porter
 Matt Cohen as Henry Porter
 Tobin Bell as Dr. Mitchell Allen
 Renee O'Connor as Dr. Jessica Ryan
 Chrissy Griffith as Nicky
 Michael Graziadei as Darren
 Mae Whitman as Alison
 Johnny Simmons as Paul
 David Gallagher as Mark
 Lesli Margherita as Gloria
 Tom Lenk as Perry
 Sammi Hanratty as Young Laura Porter
 Jarrod Bailey as Young Henry Porter
 Lucas Fleischer as Mr. Porter
 Suzanne Jamieson as Mrs. Porter
 Christopher John Fields as Detective

Production

Development and filming

Boogeyman 2 was first announced in October 2006 due to the financial success of its predecessor with Jeff Betancourt, film editor of The Exorcism of Emily Rose, When a Stranger Calls and The Grudge 2, making his directorial debut and Brian Sieve attached as writer. The film was slated to start development in January 2007 in Los Angeles, California. It was produced by Ghost House Pictures, a film production company created by Sam Raimi and Robert Tapert which specializes in creating horror films. Betancourt stated that he wanted to avoid usage of CGI as well as present a new take on the Boogeyman rather than rehashing the storyline of the first film; this led to a more grounded version of the creature in the film. As a result, and due to the film's low budget, he focused especially on the atmosphere and writing. Storyboards were used extensively to plan out the film and minimize wasted effort and resources by make-up artists on unused prosthetics; the limited budget meant that most effects could only be filmed once. The former hospital Linda Vista Community Hospital served as the primary filming location for the mental institution.

Casting
The first actor to be cast was Renee O'Connor as Dr. Jessica Ryan in December 2006; she filmed her first scenes in February 2007. O'Connor had visited her personal friend and Boogeymans producer Rob Tapert on the New Zealand set, where she had had a discussion with him about "the differences of having a supernatural demon versus a real person that can come in and be a threat." She concluded the former was scarier. On getting cast in the film and her approach to the character, she stated:I had a contract with Rob Tapert and I just emailed him and said that I really wanted to play this character. I think she would be interesting because it touches back on some of the things I've played as an actress, and that was it. [...] It was so tight in the dialogue, you just have to play with the relationships and find other things going on with the characters to make it seem like there's more depth to what's going on, that there's more of a history between them.

In mid-January, Danielle Savre was cast as the film's lead Laura Porter. On Savre, Betancourt stated that "[she] has been incredible so far and has been a real trooper. We've [...] had her running up and down these halls screaming, throwing blood on her, throwing vomit on her, throwing guts on her and she's held up so far." Tobin Bell was cast as Dr. Mitchell Allen in February and Matt Cohen as Laura's brother Henry in March. Bell modeled his portrayal after Dick Cheney.

Effects
The special effects were handled by Quantum Creation FX, who were involved with the project throughout the entire duration of filming. Ten artisans and technicians were involved in creating severed heads, puppets, prosthetic makeup, and gore gags. The killer's mask was designed by Jerad S. Marantz, and the Boogeyman itself was based on Betancourt's own childhood fears, with "skeletal things and bird corpses" as inspiration for its skin texture.

Release
Boogeyman 2 was screened in a sold-out showing on October 20, 2007, at the Screamfest Horror Film Festival in Grauman's Chinese Theatre. During the same month, it was announced that the film would be released on DVD on January 8, 2008. Outside the United States, the film was released theatrically in both Russia, where it stayed in theaters for two weeks, and Italy.

Box office
Boogeyman 2 made at least $2,484,219 from its domestic video sales and a further $1,798,418 from its international releases, bringing the total gross to $4,282,637.

Critical reception
Like the original film, Boogeyman 2 was also panned by critics, with most critics noting its terrible writing, predictable plot, overuse of jumpscares and unlikable characters as its biggest faults. Brandon Ciampaglia of IGN described it as "yet another stupid horror film" and gave it a score of 4/10. Ryan Turek of ComingSoon.net criticized the story, characters, and lack of suspense, but found the film more entertaining than the original, with better acting than it deserved. He added that despite the movie's low budget, "[Betancourt] has hashed together a fine-looking film that’s technically competent." Tristan Sinns of Dread Central awarded it two out of five stars, criticizing it for not featuring the mythological Boogeyman and having unsympathetic characters but praising the death scenes as "rather creative."

Positive reviews praised the film for presenting a more realistic approach to the Boogeyman and eschewing CGI, both of which were considered improvements over its predecessor. Its death scenes were highly praised for being extremely violent and gory. Many reviewers also recognized that the film exceeded their expectations despite its direct-to-video status and low budget. Shawn Lealos of CHUD.com gave the film a score of 6.8 out of ten, stating that it was "a very solid little horror flick that forgoes the ridiculous CGI and hokum supernatural aspects of the first movie, as well as the restraints of PG-13." In a similar review, Matthew Stern of PopMatters praised the film in comparison to its predecessor, giving it eight stars out of ten, with a consensus reading: "A film that bucks the stigma of direct-to-DVD sequels, this unyieldingly dark and bloody feature will surprise you, especially if you were unfortunate enough to catch the first one." David Nusair of Reel Film Reviews also praised Boogeyman 2 over the first film, particularly for its "satisfying kill sequences" and an entertaining supporting cast. While he criticized the middle half as "uneventful," he felt that the film "recovers nicely for a surprisingly enthralling third act" and gave it 2.5/4 stars.

Home media
The DVD, which was released as "Unrated Director's Cut" and lacks an MPAA rating, includes two different commentaries. The first one features director Betancourt and writer Sieve while the second features actors Bell and Savre along with producers Hein and Bryman. Additionally, the DVD includes a documentary called "Bringing Fear to Life: Makeup Effects from Storyboards to Screen," which shows some of the film's development using storyboards. The film has also been digitally released on Google Play, Amazon Video and Hulu.

Sequel

A sequel, titled Boogeyman 3, premiered at the Screamfest Horror Film Festival on October 18, 2008 and was released direct-to-video on January 20, 2009. Brian Sieve came back as writer, but the film features new cast members and characters, taking place on a college campus and starring Erin Cahill. As with the first movie, the Boogeyman is portrayed as a supernatural entity.

References

External links

 
 
 

2007 horror films
2007 direct-to-video films
2007 films
2000s monster movies
American supernatural horror films
Direct-to-video sequel films
Films shot in Los Angeles
Films based on urban legends
Films about fear
2000s English-language films
2000s American films
Sony Pictures direct-to-video films